A private prosecution is a criminal proceeding initiated by an individual private citizen or private organisation (such as a prosecution association) instead of by a public prosecutor who represents the state. Private prosecutions are allowed in many jurisdictions under common law, but have become less frequent in modern times as most prosecutions are now handled by professional public prosecutors instead of private individuals who retain (or are themselves) barristers.

Australia

Western Australia
A private criminal prosecution for contempt of court can be commenced against a party in Australia in the Federal Circuit Court, the Family Court (and the Family Court of Western Australia – the only jurisdiction with a state based family court) or the supreme court of a state or territory.

In the Family Court of Western Australia, an on-line form exists to commence such proceedings which can be downloaded, completed and filed.

In the Supreme Court of Western Australia, either an originating summons (Form No.75 as is an ex-parte application) or originating motion (Form No.64) must be filed specifying the alleged contempt, and personally served on the alleged contemptor before a hearing before a judge sitting in chambers unless the court orders otherwise.

If the alleged contempt occurred in relation to any specific case, the forms are required to be filed under the heading of the parties for that specific case; or if it is not alleged to have been committed with reference to a particular proceeding, shall be entitled “The State of Western Australia against” the contemnor (naming him) ex parte the applicant.

New South Wales
In New South Wales private prosecutions are legal but very rare. In 2022, gambling lobby group ClubsNSW brought a private prosecution for contempt of court against comedian and journalist Friendlyjordies and whistleblower Troy Stolz. This prosecution was also subject to an interim suppression order, making it secret temporarily.

Belize
Belize is another jurisdiction where private prosecutions can be undertaken.   In 2014, the private prosecution of politician Elvin Penner by a grass-roots citizens organization (COLA) over issuance of fraudulent passports was unsuccessful because the defense succeed in arguing that the private prosecutor did not have the power to subpoena police records on the case.   An attorney for COLA indicated that the government didn't want prosecution of Penner undertaken, and acted to block its success.

Canada
Canada is a federation and therefore has both federal and provincial offences which can be privately prosecuted. Federally, there are criminal and statutory offences, and provincially there are provincial and municipal non-criminal offences. Under Canada's constitution, all criminal offences in Canada are under federal jurisdiction.

The seditious conspirators in the Winnipeg General Strike of 1919 were tried by state-funded private prosecutors.  The funds were disbursed from the War Appropriation Act and are evidenced in the Auditor-General's reports of 1921 and 1922.

A committee chaired by Mr. Justice Allen Linden of the Law Reform Commission of Canada produced a Working Paper on Private Prosecutions in 1986.  UBC Law Professor (and later Dean) Peter T. Burns wrote a paper in 1975 for the McGill Law Journal entitled "Private Prosecutions in Canada: The Law and a Proposal for Change"; he was later the Principal Consultant for the Law Reform Commission.  Swaigen, Koehl and Hatt in 2013 summarised efforts to prosecute privately torts in the environmental domain.

Criminal offence procedure for private charges
Very basically, a citizen or organisation approaches a justice of the peace to present evidence on each element of the alleged offence. The justice then sets up a hearing with a judge to determine whether there is evidence on each element of the offence, and if approved, and if the Crown does not intervene and terminate the charge (called staying the charge) then it is allowed to proceed to and go through court via the criminal procedure.

Provincial offence procedure for private prosecution
Each province in Canada deals with private prosecutions of provincial offences in their own way.

Ontario
In Ontario, the procedure for commencing a private prosecution for a provincial offence is governed by Part III of the Provincial Offences Act, ss. 23(1) of which provides that, "Any person who, on reasonable and probable grounds, believes that one or more persons have committed an offence, may lay an information in the prescribed form and under oath before a justice alleging the offence and the justice shall receive the information."  The laying of an information as described in Part III of the Act allows anyone to commence a prosecution for a provincial offence, whereas Parts I and II of the Act may only be used by a provincial offences officer.

France 
There are three types of criminal offences in France:
Felonies (crimes), punishable by up to imprisonment for life;
Misdemeanours (délits), punishable by up to 10 years imprisonment (20 years for recidivists);
Petty offences (contraventions), punishable by criminal fine up to € (€ for recidivists).

In France private prosecution is called citation directe, and is possible only for misdemeanours and petty offences, if the victim has evidence of the offence.

The court sits with either one or three judges, without jury (a jury is present only for felonies, see cour d'assises).

In court, the private prosecutor sits alongside the public prosecutor as an accessory, and is merely called the "civil plaintiff" (partie civile), as French criminal courts also rule on tort claims during the same proceeding. Trials take place in this way even when the prosecution was initiated by the public prosecution office (which is far more usual than a private prosecution).

The plaintiff and the accused are both represented by normal attorneys, sitting at the ground-level of the courtroom, while the public prosecutor, considered by French law as a magistrate, sits on a platform as the court, although he does not participate in their deliberations.

The public prosecutor gives the court his opinion about the case after the plaintiff and before the defense. Eventually, the defendant may be convicted even if the public prosecutor requested acquittal.

In France, appeal courts retry both facts and law. The accused may appeal a conviction and sentence, but the plaintiff can only appeal damages. He cannot appeal an acquittal or a more lenient criminal punishment, contrary to the public prosecutor, who can do this even if the prosecution was private.

For felonies or when the plaintiff has insufficient evidence, he may refer to an investigating judge (juge d'instruction) who will investigate the case, and refer it to the trial court (in which he does not sit) if he discovers sufficient evidence of guilt. The investigating judge is independent from the public prosecutor's office, and may refer the case to the trial court even if the public prosecutor requested non-suit.

Indeed, French law allows some associations to instigate private prosecutions (similar to American private attorneys general), but only for some few offences such as racist speech. In 2013, this possibility has been added for some white-collar crimes.

If the defendant is convicted, the criminal court can sentence him to pay damages to the plaintiff for the criminal offence, and to reimburse his legal costs, in addition to the criminal punishment. But if the private prosecution or the referral to the investigating judge is regarded as abusive, the plaintiff may be sentenced to pay damages to the accused and a civil fine to the state.

Ireland 
Private prosecutions remain possible in the Republic of Ireland, though only at the District Court level where less serious offences are heard before a judge only.

The continuing existence of the right to private prosecution was confirmed in 2013 in the decision of the case Kelly & anor -v- Ryan ([2013] IEHC 321).

New Zealand 

Private prosecutions remain legal in New Zealand.

Philippines

Private prosecutors in the Philippines are private attorneys that work with police and public prosecutors to help bring criminal cases. They often work to get the location of a trial moved to more neutral court, outside of the influence of local power brokers, and to prepare the necessary legal petitions and other documents. They also help to look after the victim's family and keep media and public attention focused on the case.

Private prosecutors can be involved in cases in front of the national anti-corruption court the Sandiganbayan.

Singapore 
A private prosecution is brought by a private individual if want to seek redress for a wrong they believe has been done to them. That individual would have to first file a complaint with a Magistrate at the State Courts. If the person does not have a lawyer, it can be that individual may conduct the prosecution themselves.

South Africa

NSPCA South Africa
The National Council of Societies for the Prevention of Cruelty to Animals (NSPCA) had its victory in the Constitutional Court of South Africa on 8 December 2016 when the organisation won its case it brought before the Court to institute Private Prosecutions in terms of Section 8 of the Criminal Procedure Act, 1977. This after the organisation lost its cases it brought before the North Gauteng High Court and the Supreme Court of Appeal of South Africa on the same matter of Private Prosecutions. The reason the NSPCA brought the case before the Courts is because despite “overwhelming” evidence of animal cruelty or abuse‚ the National Prosecuting Authority of South Africa (NPA) declined to prosecute the cases brought by the organisation, resulting in animal abusers not being charged on charges of animal cruelty. The Constitutional Court of South Africa also ruled that the respondents, the Minister of Justice and Constitutional Development and the National Director of Public Prosecutions, were to pay the organisation's costs in all three applications.

United Kingdom
Private prosecutions are permitted in the United Kingdom. They are governed by different rules in the different jurisdictions.

England and Wales
Private prosecution is allowed in English law. In the early history of England, the victim of a crime and his family had the right to hire a private lawyer to prosecute criminal charges against the person alleged to have injured the victim. In the 18th century, prosecution was private for almost all criminal offences against the person, usually by the victim.  One reason for this was that prosecution had never been conceived of as a public matter.  The English system was based on the principles of individual and local prosecution in which the right of the private citizen was paramount.  The exception to this norm was in offences where the victim was the Crown, and the Attorney-General and the Solicitor-General represented the prosecution at state trials; for an example, see the 1637 ship money tax protest case of John Hampden.

As detailed above, a route to prosecution had been by victims at their own expense or lawyers acting on their behalf. From the Metropolitan Police Act 1829 onwards, as the police forces began their present form, they began to take on the burden of bringing prosecutions against suspected criminals.

In 1880, Sir John Maule was appointed to be the first Director of Public Prosecutions, operating as a part of the Home Office. The jurisdiction was only for the decision as to whether to prosecute, and just for a very small number of difficult or important cases. Once prosecution had been authorised, the matter was turned over to the Treasury Solicitor. Police forces continued to be responsible for the bulk of cases, sometimes referring difficult ones to the Director.

Prior to its termination in 1933, criminal prosecution required a true bill of indictment from the grand jury, and so frivolous and vexatious proceedings were designed to be avoided at this stage (although this did not turn out to be the case in practice).

In 1962, the Royal Commission on the Police recommended that police forces set up independent prosecution departments so as to avoid having the same officers investigate and prosecute cases.

The Royal Commission's recommendation was not implemented by all police forces, and so in 1978 another Royal Commission was struck, this time headed by Sir Cyril Philips. It reported in 1981, recommending that a single unified Crown Prosecution Service with responsibility for all public prosecutions in England and Wales be set up. A White Paper was released in 1983, becoming the Prosecution of Offences Act 1985, which established the Crown Prosecution Service under the direction of the Director of Public Prosecutions, consisting of a merger of his old department with the existing police prosecution departments. It started operating in 1986.  The CPS can also prevent a private prosecution from continuing by taking it over and then discontinuing it. The CPS supposedly will do this only where there is not enough evidence to make a proper case, or where a prosecution is against the public interest or could cause an injustice. In reaching this decision, it must balance the public good against a duty to preserve an individual's right to prosecute under the 1985 act.

When taking over any private prosecution, the CPS may direct the police to conduct further investigations. The intention of this was to ensure the best available evidence was placed before the court, as further trials were generally excluded until 2003 by the double jeopardy rule. The latter rule was abrogated in certain circumstances of "new and compelling evidence", and for a limited range of the most serious offences such as rape, armed robbery and murder, by the Criminal Justice Act 2003.  Recommended by Blunkett, Irvine and Goldsmith, this change is permitted by the optional Article 4 of the Seventh Protocol to the European Convention on Human Rights, although the United Kingdom is not a party to it.

Scotland
Private prosecutions are rare in Scots law and require special circumstances surrounding the crime to be evident. Leave to prosecute must be obtained by granting of a bill of criminal letters by the High Court of Justiciary. Within the 20th century, only two such applications were made.

United States
In colonial America, because of Dutch (and possibly French) practice and the expansion of the office of attorney general, public officials came to dominate the prosecution of crimes. However, privately funded prosecutors constituted a significant element of the state criminal justice system throughout the nineteenth century.

The right to private prosecution in federal cases was removed following the 1981 Supreme Court decision in Leeke v. Timmerman, affirming an earlier decision in Linda R. S. v. Richard D.. However, a federal prosecutor may appoint a private attorney to prosecute a case. Elsewhere, private prosecution is governed by state laws.

Alabama 
State law currently allows private citizens the right to press charges under certain circumstances. In Alabama, a citizen or "victim" who has probable cause to believe that a crime has been committed can directly go to court and sign an arrest warrant before a magistrate, without the police or a judge's approval. The government will then handle the prosecution of the offense.

California 
Private prosecutions are not legal in California.

Colorado 

In 1974, the Colorado Supreme Court ruled that private prosecutions were improper and prejudicial to the defendant.

Georgia 

In Georgia, criminal proceedings may be initiated at the request of a private citizen, but only after the defendant is given an opportunity to argue why he or she should not be charged.

Idaho 

Idaho allows private citizens to file criminal complaints to a magistrate; the magistrate can issue an arrest warrant upon satisfaction that a crime has occurred.

Kentucky 

Kentucky allows a private citizen to initiate criminal cases by filing criminal complaints, although it is up to the county attorney or Commonwealth's attorney to decide whether to proceed with the case.

Maryland 

Maryland allows private citizens to file affidavits against another citizen.

Massachusetts 

Private prosecutions in Massachusetts were declared void in 1849 and formally outlawed in 1855.

Michigan 

Michigan banned private prosecutions in 1875. Private citizens can however file and attest misdemeanor arrest warrants which if accepted by a judge or magistrate would be automatically transferred to a prosecuting attorney.

Minnesota 

The Minnesota Supreme Court ruled in 1977 in State ex rel. Wild v. Otis that a private citizen does not have a right to prosecute an alleged crime.

Missouri 

The right to private prosecution in Missouri was removed in 1976 following the decision in State v. Harrington.

New Hampshire 

New Hampshire allows private prosecution of any crime that does not carry incarceration as a possible penalty. However, prosecutors have the right to dismiss private criminal charges.

New Jersey 

New Jersey continues to allow private prosecutions in its Municipal Courts. However, the 1995 decision of State v. Storm prohibited private prosecutions if the party intending to prosecute has a conflict of interest with the defendants or a financial interest in the case. Furthermore, state law states that all private prosecutions require approval of the county prosecutor and the court.

New York 

In 2002, a federal district court concluded in Kampfer v. Vonderheide that private prosecutions were barred under New York law as a violation of the defendant's due process rights. However, in Kampfer the court distinguished, in dicta, private prosecutions where there is an "underlying civil cause of action" in relation to the events which gave rise to the prosecution.

North Carolina 

Private prosecutors were used in North Carolina as late as 1975. The court ruled in State v. Best in 1974 that an elected prosecutor must be in charge of all prosecutions. A private citizen may go before a magistrate to request that criminal process be issued, but any such charges are prosecuted by the State.

Ohio 

Ohio state law allows private citizens to file an affidavit to support criminal charges. However, the actual prosecution is limited to the state. Only prosecutors can present a criminal case to a grand jury. State law was further amended in 2006 to bar judges from issuing arrest warrants in private prosecution cases.

Pennsylvania 

Private prosecutions in Pennsylvania require approval from a state prosecutor.

Rhode Island 

In 2001, the Rhode Island Supreme Court ruled in Diane S. Cronan ex rel. State v. John J. Cronan that a private citizen could file criminal complaints for misdemeanors. In order to do so under R.I. Gen. Laws § 12-10-12, a judge of the district court or superior court must choose to place the criminal complaint on file.  However, prosecution of felonies remains limited to the state. Private prosecutors also cannot seek penalties of greater than one year of incarceration or a fine of greater than $1,000.

South Carolina 

The right was removed from South Carolina law in the nineteenth century. However, private citizens may still initiate a criminal case by filing a request with a magistrate, although magistrates can issue only a summons in response to private criminal complaints.

Wisconsin 

Private prosecutions in Wisconsin were outlawed following the decision of Biemel v. State in 1855. In 1890, the court ruled that a private attorney can assist in a prosecution as long as there is no conflict of interest.

Controversy
Bruce L. Benson's To Serve and Protect lauds the role of private prosecutors, often employed by prosecution associations, in serving the needs of crime victims in England. There have been calls for restoring the practice of private prosecution, especially in cases of official misconduct, where judges, public prosecutors, and the police act in concert to violate the law. Some libertarian theorists hold that public prosecutors should not exist, but that crimes should instead be treated as civil torts. Murray Rothbard writes, "In a libertarian world, there would be no crimes against an ill-defined 'society,' and therefore no such person as a 'district attorney' who decides on a charge and then presses those charges against an alleged criminal."

Private prosecution is sometimes regarded with suspicion as a potential avenue for vexatious or malicious prosecution. Okagbue writes that the most useful control against such abuses is the power of the court to refuse to allow the case to proceed where it is of the opinion that there is not enough evidence to support the charge. The cost of private prosecution, including potential civil liability for malicious prosecution, can also deter frivolous prosecutions.

Notable private prosecution attempts
Oscar Wilde initiated an unsuccessful private prosecution for libel against the Marquess of Queensberry when the latter publicly accused Wilde of sodomy, which was then a crime. This was unsuccessful, and Wilde himself ended up facing charges brought by the DPP (following petition by Queensberry’s lawyer) and was ultimately convicted of gross indecency, with a punishment of two years at hard labor.
Whitehouse v. Lemon (1977) was the last successful blasphemy prosecution in the United Kingdom.
In 1995 Women Against Rape, together with Legal Action for Women and the English Collective of Prostitutes, helped two women bring the first private prosecution for rape in England and Wales after the prosecuting authority refused to prosecute. They went to court without the Crown Prosecution Service (CPS). On the same evidence the CPS had said was insufficient, the man was given a 16 year sentence, reduced to 11 years on appeal. This trial was made into a play Pursuing Justice – Sex workers take their rapist to court, which was performed in 2015 to sell-out audiences.
The family of Stephen Lawrence brought charges against the five men they alleged had killed him (1996). The private prosecution was unsuccessful; one suspect's acquittal in the criminal trial was quashed in 2011, with a subsequent trial resulting in his and another suspect's conviction in 2012.
 Following the 2014 police killing of Tamir Rice in Ohio, activists attempted to invoke the law to charge the officers involved. Although a judge agreed that there was probable cause for charges, he could only send the case back to the prosecutor due to the 2006 amendment to state law that bars judges from issuing arrest warrants in criminal cases initiated by private citizens.

See also
 Lawsuit
 Private attorney general
 Criminal appeal

References

External links
The Guardian, 28 July 2009, Can a member of the public bring a prosecution against the prime minister?
 Court Declines to Address Private Prosecution, Constitutional Law Prof Blog, May 24, 2010.
 Brief for petitioner Robertson.
 Brief for respondent Watson.
 Plea bargains and private prosecutors, James Bickford, SCOTUSblog, April 2, 2010.
 Private Prosecution: A Remedy for District Attorneys' Unwarranted Inaction, [Unsigned] The Yale Law Journal Vol. 65, No. 2 (Dec., 1955), pp. 209–234.
 Delegation of the Criminal Prosecution Function to Private Actors, Roger A. Fairfax, Jr., U.C. Davis Law Review, Vol. 43:411.
The Independent, 16 August 2014, Two-tier justice: Private prosecution revolution
 Lexology.com: Why, how and when to bring a private prosecution for design right infringement!

Prosecution